The Comely Stakes is an American Thoroughbred horse race held annually at Aqueduct Racetrack in Queens, New York. Open to three year old fillies, it is raced on dirt  over a distance of one mile.  The Grade III event offers a purse of $200,000.

The race was named in honor of the filly Comely, who, in a remarkable performance as a two-year-old, defeated older male horses in winning the first running of the Fall Highweight Handicap in 1914. Going into 2019, she remains the only two-year-old to win the Fall Highweight Handicap and one of only a few two-year-olds to defeat older horses in a major stakes race.

Inaugurated in 1945 at Jamaica Race Course, it was raced there through 1951 and again in 1959. For 1952 and 1953 it was hosted by the Empire City Race Track in Yonkers and Belmont Park in 1976, 1981, 1984, and again in 1985. There was no race run from 1954 to 1958. When revived in 1959 the race was open to two-year-olds of either sex and won by the 1960 Preakness Stakes winner, Bally Ache. On April 30, 1975 the superstar filly and future Hall of Fame inductee Ruffian won the Comely by eight lengths in stakes record time.

On May 11, 1985, Abigail Fuller became the first female jockey to win the Comely Stakes. She was aboard Mom's Command, a future Hall of Fame filly bred and raced by her father, Peter Fuller.

The Comely was run in two divisions in 1953, 1963, and 1970.

Records
Speed  record: 
 1:33.50 – @ 1 mile (8 furlongs) Bella Bellucci (2002)
 1:21.20 – @ 7 furlongs Ruffian (1975)

Most wins by a jockey:
 4 – Braulio Baeza (1962, 1963, 1967, 1970)
 4 – Jorge Chavez (1995, 1996, 1998, 2004)

Most wins by a trainer:
 4 – H. Allen Jerkens (1976, 1994, 1997, 2004)

Most wins by an owner:
 2 – Alfred G. Vanderbilt II (1951, 1953)
 2 – Wheatley Stable (1960, 1970)
 2 – William Haggin Perry (1963, 1964)
 2 – George D. Widener Jr. (1965, 1969)
 2 – Diana M. Firestone (1980, 1981)
 2 – H. Joseph Allen (1982, 1989)
 2 – Bohemia Stable (1994, 1997)
 2 – Charles E. Fipke (2015, 2016)

Winners

External links
 Video of Ruffian's win in the 1975 Comely Stakes.

References

1945 establishments in New York City
Horse races in New York (state)
Aqueduct Racetrack
Jamaica Race Course
Flat horse races for three-year-old fillies
Grade 3 stakes races in the United States
Recurring sporting events established in 1945